is a passenger railway station located in Kita-ku of the city of Okayama, Okayama Prefecture, Japan. It is operated by West Japan Railway Company (JR West).

Lines

Station layout
The station consists of one ground-level side platform serving single bi-directional track. There is no station building, and the station is unattended.

History
Ashimori Station opened on November 15, 1904 with the opening of the Tsuyama Line.  With the privatization of the Japan National Railways (JNR) on April 1, 1987, the station came under the aegis of the West Japan Railway Company. The station building was rebuilt in February 2020.

Passenger statistics
In fiscal 2019, the station was used by an average of 636 passengers daily..

Surrounding area
Ashimori River
Japan National Route 180
Japan National Route 429

See also
List of railway stations in Japan

References

External links

 Ashimori Station Official Site

Railway stations in Okayama
Kibi Line
Railway stations in Japan opened in 1904